Karawane is a board game published in 1990 by Ravensburger.

Contents
Karawane is a game in which camels are used in a race game.

Reception
Brian Walker reviewed Karawane for Games International magazine, and gave it a rating of 4 out of 10, and stated that "If the game had arrived in a small box with a matching board and retailed for about a tenner then no one would have complained. Instead, it is presented as Ravensburger's 'adult' game and makes the adjective 'ostentatious' seem wholly inadequate."

Reviews
Jeux & Stratégie nouvelle formule #6 (as "Caravane")

References

Board games introduced in 1990
Ravensburger games